Restauradores station is on the Blue Line of the Lisbon Metro.

History
It is one of the 11 stations that belong to the original Lisbon Metro network, opened on December 29, 1959. This station is located on Praça dos Restauradores, from which it takes its name, and connects to the Rossio Railway Station (Sintra Line). The architectural design of the original station is by Falcão e Cunha.

On February 11, 1977, the station was extended, based on the architectural design of Benoliel de Carvalho. On September 15, 1994, the north atrium of the station was refurbished, based on the architectural design of Sanchez Jorge. On August 8, 1998, the south atrium of the station was refurbished, based on the architectural design of Manuel Ponte

Connections

Urban buses

Carris 
 Ascensor da Glória
 202 Cais do Sodré ⇄ Fetais (morning service)
 709 Campo de Ourique ⇄ Restauradores
 711 Terreiro do Paço ⇄ Alto da Damaia
 732 Marquês de Pombal ⇄ Caselas
 736 Cais do Sodré ⇄ Odivelas (Bairro Dr. Lima Pimentel)
 759 Restauradores ⇄ Estação Oriente (Interface)

Aerobus 
 Linha 1 Aeroporto ⇄ Cais do Sodré

Rail

Comboios de Portugal 
 Sintra ⇄ Azambuja
 Mira Sintra/Meleças ⇄ Lisboa - Rossio

See also
 List of Lisbon metro stations

References

External links

Blue Line (Lisbon Metro) stations
Railway stations opened in 1959